is a railway station in Shiroishi-ku, Sapporo, Hokkaido, Japan, operated by Hokkaido Railway Company (JR Hokkaido). The station is numbered H03.

Station layout
The station consists of two island platforms (platforms 2/3 and 5/6) serving four tracks, with two additional through tracks (tracks 1 and 4). Previously, there was a side platform adjoining track 1, although it was fenced off as it was used only for freight services; this platform was removed during the construction of the current station building (completed in 2011).

The station has automated ticket machines, automated turnstiles which accept Kitaca, and a "Midori no Madoguchi" staffed ticket office.

Platforms

Adjacent stations

Surrounding area
 Sapporo-Shiroishi Bus Terminal
 Sapporo-Shiroishi Post office

See also
 List of railway stations in Japan

References

External links
 Shiroishi JR Hokkaido map

Railway stations in Japan opened in 1903
Railway stations in Sapporo